First Take is an American sports talk television show on ESPN. Episodes air daily Monday through Friday, with the live episode airing from 10am ET until noon, with reruns from noon to 2pm ET on ESPN2 and from 2 to 4pm ET on ESPNews.

The show broadcast from Studio E at ESPN's headquarters in Bristol, Connecticut for its first eleven years, before the show moved to the network's new South Street Seaport facility on Pier 17 in September 2018 after Labor Day. It also has "roadshow" broadcasts for events such as the weeks of the College Football Playoff, the Super Bowl and the NBA Finals from the cities where those events take place.

The entire show is available as a commercial-free podcast following the broadcast of the recorded show. Clips of the episodes are also uploaded to the ESPN YouTube page for viewing.

Format
Analysts and long-time sports reporter Stephen A. Smith (along with guests) is featured, with Molly Qerim acting as the show's moderator, introducing discussion topics. The two debate the topics with each other and the guests, along with providing occasional hot takes, about the sports news of the day.

Cast

 Stephen A. Smith: (2012–present)
Former analysts
 Skip Bayless: (2007–16)
 Max Kellerman: (2016–21)

Host (full-time)
 Jay Crawford: (2007–12)
 Dana Jacobson: (2007–11)
 Reischea Canidate: (2009–11)
 Cari Champion: (2012–15)
 Molly Qerim: (2015–present)

Frequent guest analysts
 Jalen Rose: NBA Analyst
 JJ Redick: NBA Analyst
 Brian Windhorst: NBA Analyst
 Kendrick Perkins: NBA Analyst
 Vince Carter: NBA Analyst
 Tim Legler: NBA Analyst
 Ryan Clark: NFL Analyst 
 Damien Woody: NFL Analyst 
 Louis Riddick: NFL Analyst
 Taylor Strickland: NFL/NBA/MLB/College Football Analyst
 Domonique Foxworth: NFL Analyst
 Marcus Spears: NFL/College Football Analyst
 Dan Orlovsky: NFL Analyst
 Keyshawn Johnson: NFL Analyst
 Bart Scott: NFL Analyst
 Jeff Passan: MLB Analyst
 Harry Douglas: NFL Analyst
 Tim Tebow: NFL/College Football Analyst
 Michael Irvin: NFL Analyst
 Sam Acho: NFL/College Football Analyst
 Alan Hahn: NBA Analyst
 Chris "Mad Dog" Russo: NFL/NBA/MLB Analyst
 P. K. Subban: NHL Analyst

Frequent Guest Hosts
 Charly Arnolt: (2019–present)
 Rosalyn Gold-Onwude: (2019–present)

Former guest analysts/hosts
 Rob Parker: Analyst/guest host (suspended from ESPN on December 20, 2012; did not return to network)
 Chris Broussard: Now works for Fox Sports.
 Will Cain (2015–20): Analyst/guest host, now works for Fox News and Fox & Friends Weekend
 Ryan Hollins: NBA Analyst
 Jeff Saturday: NFL Analyst, now the interim head coach of the Indianapolis Colts

History
The show was originally hosted and moderated by Jay Crawford and Dana Jacobson, formerly of the show's predecessor Cold Pizza.

In August 2011, the show underwent a drastic format change. Segments of the show were taken out and Skip Bayless' role in the show saw a dramatic increase, while the show itself began to focus on the debate. The ratings for the show saw a drastic increase as a result, with a reported 58% increase for the first 3 months of 2012, compared to the same time in 2011.

On April 30, 2012, it was announced on-air that regular guest contributor Stephen A. Smith would be joining First Take on a permanent, five-day-per-week basis. On occasions he was reporting from elsewhere, Rob Parker was frequently featured as his replacement until December 20, 2012, when he was suspended for comments made about Robert Griffin III; he would not return, as ESPN allowed his contract to expire, rather than re-sign him.

In June 2012, long-time host Crawford announced he would be leaving First Take in order to present SportsCenter.

On July 23, 2012, the show debuted a new set and a new opening song Every Word Great by Wale featuring Stalley. It now featured an open slideshow showing Bayless and Smith arriving at campus (Once Kellerman joined the show in 2016, scenes showing Kellerman replaced those of Bayless). They are still in Studio E but they are in the middle of it, with a new desk.

In line with these changes, First Take introduced on October 1, 2012 a new permanent moderator, Cari Champion, previously a reporter from the Tennis Channel.

Previously, the show had a rotation of moderators, such as Todd Grisham, Don Bell (now Sports Director & anchor with Philadelphia's KYW-TV), Cindy Brunson (now with Fox Sports Arizona) and Jemele Hill.

On January 13, 2015, the first special edition of the show aired after the 2015 College Football Playoff National Championship titled First Take: College Football Championship Post Game Special.

On June 19, 2015, Champion left First Take due to her promotion to SportsCenter anchor. The following month, she was replaced on an interim basis by Molly Qerim, who was promoted to permanent host on September 15.

On July 25, 2016, Max Kellerman permanently replaced Skip Bayless as the First Take co-host as Bayless had left ESPN to join rival network FS1 and started another sports talk program called Skip and Shannon: Undisputed.

On January 3, 2017, First Take switched channels with the two editions of SportsCenter. First Take moved to ESPN, while the 10:00 a.m. and 11:00 a.m. ET editions of SportsCenter moved to ESPN2. The move was made in an effort to boost the show's ratings, which had declined since Bayless' departure from ESPN.

In September 2018, the show moved to ESPN's New York studios, and received a new logo and graphics as part of the move.

In 2021, Kellerman left First Take to allow for a new format involving rotating guest analysts appearing alongside Smith. Kellerman's last day on the show was September 1. Smith later revealed that he wanted Kellerman off of First Take as he believed the two of them lacked the chemistry they once had, although he clarified that there were no hard feelings towards Kellerman: "I wasn't pointing a finger at him. I was saying we did not work as a pair."

Controversy
Through the show's success, First Take has  experienced substantial controversy and faced increasing criticism, mostly concerning perceived sensationalism.

Among claims have been that First Take has used hot button racial issues to create inflammatory debates and increase ratings. Most notably, during a discussion regarding Washington Redskins quarterback Robert Griffin III, frequent guest Rob Parker asked whether Griffin III was a "brother" or a "cornball brother." When pressed by host Cari Champion as to what that meant, Parker mentioned that Griffin III had a white fiancée and mentioned claims that Griffin III was a Republican. In response, Bayless asked whether Griffin III's braids did anything to assuage Parker's concerns. Stephen A. Smith has also been at the center of the controversy with remarks about Cleveland Cavalier J.R. Smith's dress wear during a Cavaliers game that included a "hoodie" being worn on the bench in late October 2017. This resulted in a public rant by J.R. Smith taking to Twitter to express his disapproval of Stephen A. Smith's comments, ultimately ending the rant with the accusation of Smith being an "Uncle Tom". J.R. Smith made these remarks due to a segment from Stephen A. Smith stating that "white folks" would be of disapproval in regard to what could be a "Trayvon Martin case being revisited" with a tweet questioning the work of Stephen A. Smith stating, "this man is always reaching. What does me wearing a hoodie on the bench have anything to do with reminding people of #TrayvonMartin". Stephen A. Smith not only reprimanded Smith for wearing a hoodie during the fourth quarter of a late October game, but reprimanded Nike for making a uniform that is unprofessional amongst racial remarks.

The show has been criticized for what is perceived by many as its excessive coverage of the career of Tim Tebow. During his tenure with the Jets, in which he did not start in a game, and threw just eight passes the entire season, Tebow was nonetheless often a leading topic.

As Cleveland Cavaliers forward LeBron James began a series of playoff appearances with the Cavaliers, host Skip Bayless became well known for his belief that James had been overrated by the media and not received enough criticism for his team's playoff failures. Bayless has himself been criticized by fans as well as members of the media for exaggerating James' failures and diminishing his successes. In an exchange with Dallas Mavericks owner Mark Cuban, Cuban argued that Bayless had reduced his analysis of the 2011 and 2012 NBA Finals series to subjective and limited assessments of player psyche, and had not even considered the offensive and defensive strategies used by the teams in each series.

On July 29, 2014, ESPN suspended co-host Stephen A. Smith from the show for one week over his controversial comments regarding the NFL's decision to suspend Baltimore Ravens running back Ray Rice for the first two games of the 2014 season as a result of his domestic violence incident with his fiancée in February 2014.

In February 2016, Stephen A. Smith, as well as ESPN, Little League Baseball, and Chris Janes, were sued by the parents of players from the Jackie Robinson West baseball team, whose 2014 Little League World Series title was vacated after Janes found the team had used ineligible players from outside a defined regional boundary. The lawsuit contained an allegation that Smith had made a defamatory remark regarding the controversy on First Take, which "directly accused the JRW parents of perpetrating a fraud against the Little League".

During the 2021 Major League Baseball season, host Stephen A. Smith's comments regarding Japanese All-Star Shohei Ohtani garnered controversy. During an episode of First Take, Smith was quoted as stating, "This brother is special, make no mistake about it. But the fact that you've got a foreign player that doesn't speak English, that needs an interpreter—believe it or not, I think contributes to harming the game to some degree, when that's your box office appeal. It needs to be somebody like Bryce Harper, Mike Trout, those guys. ... I understand that baseball is an international sport itself in terms of participation. But when you talk about an audience gravitating to the tube, or to the ballpark, to actually watch you, I don't think it helps that the number one face is a dude that needs an interpreter so that you can understand what the hell he's saying in this country."

Smith's comments were met with backlash on social media, with many feeling such statements were insensitive and offensive to the Asian community. Smith later issued a statement through Twitter, clarifying that his comments were misinterpreted and focused more so on baseball's "marketability and promotion". He further apologized, stating "As an African-American, keenly aware of the damage stereotyping has done to many in this country, it should've elevated my sensitivities even more. Based on my words, I failed in that regard and it's on me, and me alone! I screwed up. In this day and age, with all the violence being perpetrated against the Asian Community, my comments – albeit unintentional – were clearly insensitive and regrettable. There's simply no other way to put it. I contributed to [Asian-hate] yesterday and that's inexcusable."

Ohtani, amidst a historic season at the time, responded in an interview, stating "Of course, I would want to. Obviously, it wouldn't hurt to be able to speak English. There would only be positive things to come from that. But I came here to play baseball, at the end of the day, and I've felt like my play on the field could be my way of communicating with the people, with the fans."

References

External links
 Official website
 

2007 American television series debuts
2000s American television news shows
2010s American television news shows
2020s American television news shows
American sports television series
English-language television shows
ESPN2 original programming
Sirius XM Radio programs